Gao Chongmin (1891 – July 29, 1971) was a Chinese male politician, who served as the vice chairperson of the Chinese People's Political Consultative Conference.

References 

1891 births
1971 deaths
Vice Chairpersons of the National Committee of the Chinese People's Political Consultative Conference